Simmone Morrow (born 31 October 1976 in Cowell, South Australia) is a softball player from Australia, who won a bronze medal at the 2000 Summer Olympics and a silver medal at the 2004 Summer Olympics. She plays in the outfield.

External links
 Australia Institute of Sports profile

1976 births
Australian softball players
Living people
Olympic softball players of Australia
Softball players at the 2000 Summer Olympics
Softball players at the 2004 Summer Olympics
Softball players at the 2008 Summer Olympics
Olympic silver medalists for Australia
Olympic bronze medalists for Australia
People from Cowell, South Australia
Olympic medalists in softball
Medalists at the 2008 Summer Olympics
Medalists at the 2004 Summer Olympics
Medalists at the 2000 Summer Olympics